Burrows Township is one of eighteen townships in Platte County, Nebraska, United States. The population was 261 at the 2020 census. A 2021 estimate placed the township's population at 257.

The Village of Tarnov lies within the Township.

Burrows Township was established in or before 1873.

See also
County government in Nebraska

References

External links
City-Data.com

Townships in Platte County, Nebraska
Townships in Nebraska